Koo Koo Roo was an American fast casual restaurant chain specializing in charbroiled chicken founded in 1988 by Los Angeles-based restaurateurs Mike and Ray Badalian. The name "Koo Koo Roo" was an onomatopoeic reference to the crow of a rooster. After a series of expansions and ownership changes, in which Koo Koo Roo struggled for profitability throughout the 1990s, the last location in Santa Monica, California, closed in 2014.  In 2021, Luby's Restaurants, Inc. sold Koo Koo Roo to an independent third party.

History
The Badalian brothers originally ran two locations in Los Angeles, one in Koreatown and the other on Beverly Boulevard close to the Beverly Center. The brothers opened their first restaurant in 1988 on west Sixth Street near Normandie Avenue in Los Angeles. The restaurant served skinless chicken that was marinated in vegetable juices and char-broiled over open flames and served with a  fold-able Middle Eastern inspired flatbread that they called "Koo Koo Roo bread." The only sides available were a Middle Eastern cucumber and onion salad, an eggplant salad, and a mixture of pinto and Northern beans. The only dessert initially available was frozen yogurt.  Everything on the initial menu had relative low calories when compared to offerings at other chicken restaurants.

Impressed by the quality of the food, Berg met with the Badalians and later invested  as a silent partner, eventually investing more and taking control of the restaurant. The following year, the company became public with its stock being traded on NASDAQ under the stock ticker KKRO.

The company had 15 locations in February 1992. Two years later, the number of locations had dropped to 8.

In a bid to diversify the company, Koo Koo Roo launched a coffee bar chain called Arrosto Coffee Co. and acquired a color-your-own-ceramics chain called Color Me Mine in 1996.

After suffering financial problems during the previous three years, the company was acquired by Family Restaurants Inc., the owner of Chi-Chi's and El Torito Mexican restaurants, in 1998 for $143 million in stock. At the time of the announcement, Koo Koo Roo had 38 locations in California, Florida, and Nevada. Before the acquisition was completed, Koo Koo Roo sold off its Arrosto Coffee Co. and Color Me Mine chains.

Immediate after Family Restaurants completed the acquisition of the Koo Koo Roo and Hamburger Hamlet chains, Family Restaurants Inc., renamed itself Koo Koo Roo Enterprises and then Prandium Inc. a few months later. Prandium was the parent company for the Koo Koo Roo, El Torito, Chi-Chi's and Hamburger Hamlet chains.

By January 1999, Koo Koo Roo had 40 locations.

In 2003, the Prandium subsidiaries Koo Koo Roo, Chi-Chi's, and Hamburger Hamlet, filed for Chapter 11 bankruptcy protection. At the time of the filing, Koo Koo Roo had 28 locations, down from 38 in 2001. As the result of the filing, the company was acquired by Magic Brands. Three years later, the number of locations dropped to 13 before Magic Brands closed an additional 10 locations. Luby's acquired Koo Koo Roo and its remaining 3 locations in 2010 after parent Magic Brands filed for bankruptcy. Luby's sold Koo Koo Roo in 2021 and it is now independently owned.

In popular culture
In the 2010 film, Get Him to the Greek, Sean Combs' character, Sergio Roma, at a meeting berating his record label staff's unsuccessful signed artists, declares he's going to be alright cause he owns twenty Koo Koo Roos, then corrected by an assistant that he owns twenty-one, ironic in hindsight because the chain is out of business, also, the restaurant is never seen in the film.

See also
 List of chicken restaurants
 List of fast-food chicken restaurants

References

External links

1988 establishments in California
1998 mergers and acquisitions
2003 mergers and acquisitions
2010 mergers and acquisitions
2014 disestablishments in California
Companies based in Los Angeles
Defunct restaurant chains in the United States
Fast casual restaurants
Fast-food chains of the United States
Fast-food franchises
Fast-food poultry restaurants
Regional restaurant chains in the United States
Restaurants established in 1988
Restaurants in California
Companies that filed for Chapter 11 bankruptcy in 2010